Cofinimmo is the foremost listed Belgian real estate company specialising in rental property. The company
owns a property portfolio worth over €4 billion, representing a total area of nearly 2,000,000m² spread over Belgium, The Netherlands, France, Germany and Spain. Its main
investment segments are healthcare properties (nursing and care homes, revalidation clinics, psychiatric clinics, medical office buildings,...) and offices, and property of distribution networks (portfolio of pubs let to AB InBev and portfolio of insurance branches let to MAAF). On 30.06.2019, Cofinimmo's total market capitalisation stood at 3.0 billion EUR.

Cofinimmo is listed on Euronext Brussels and a member of the BEL20 index. The company benefits from the REIT regime in Belgium (SIR/GVV), in France (SIIC) and in the Netherlands (FBI). Its activities are supervised by the Financial Services and Markets Authority (FSMA), the Belgian regulator.

On 30 June 2019, Cofinimmo's total market capitalisation amounted to more than EUR 3 billion. The company applies an investment policy aimed at offering a low-risk, socially responsible long-term investment that generates a regular, predictable and growing dividend.

History

Cofinimmo was founded in 1983 with a capital of 6 million EUR.

1994: Listing on the Brussels stock exchange, now called Euronext

1996: Adoption of Belgian SICAFI status

2005: First healthcare real estate investment in Belgium; Awarding of the first Public-Private Partnership (PPP): the Antwerp courthouse

2007: Partnership with AB InBev Group for a portfolio of 1,068 pubs and restaurants located in Belgium and the Netherlands (Pubstone)

2008: Start-up in France in the healthcare real estate segment; Adoption of SIIC status (French REIT regime)

2011: Partnership with MAAF for a portfolio of 283 insurance agencies in France (Cofinimur I); First emission of convertible bonds

2012: Start-up in the Netherlands in the healthcare real estate segment; Adoption of FBI status (Dutch REIT regime)

2013: Start of reconversion works to transform office buildings into residential (Woluwe 34 and Livingstone I)

2014: Start-up in Germany in the healthcare real estate segment; Adoption of RREC status in Belgium

2015: Capital increase with preference rights in the amount of 285 million EUR; Continued investments in healthcare real estate in the Netherlands and Germany

2016: Continued investments in healthcare real estate in the Netherlands and Germany; Acquisition of five office buildings in Brussels Opening of the first Flex Corners® and Lounges®

2017: Issue of ‘Green and Social Bonds’; Continued investments in healthcare real estate in the Netherlands and Germany; Delivery of the reconversion works to transform an office building into a nursing and care home (Woluwe 106-108)

2018: Capital increase with irrevocable allocation rights in the amount of 155 million EUR; Acquisition of a portfolio of 17 nursing and care homes in Germany; 50% of global portfolio invested in healthcare real estate

2019: Start-up in Spain in the healthcare real estate segment

References

External links

Companies based in Brussels
Companies listed on Euronext Brussels